The United States Virgin Islands competed at the 2004 Summer Olympics in Athens, Greece, from 13 to 29 August 2004.

Athletics

Virgin Islands athletes have so far achieved qualifying standards in the following athletics events (up to a maximum of 3 athletes in each event at the 'A' Standard, and 1 at the 'B' Standard).

Men

Women

Key
 Note–Ranks given for track events are within the athlete's heat only
 Q = Qualified for the next round
 q = Qualified for the next round as a fastest loser or, in field events, by position without achieving the qualifying target
 NR = National record
 N/A = Round not applicable for the event
 Bye = Athlete not required to compete in round

Sailing

Virgin Islands sailors have qualified one boat for each of the following events.

Open

M = Medal race; OCS = On course side of the starting line; DSQ = Disqualified; DNF = Did not finish; DNS= Did not start; RDG = Redress given

Shooting

Men

Swimming

Virgin Islands swimmers earned qualifying standards in the following events (up to a maximum of 2 swimmers in each event at the A-standard time, and 1 at the B-standard time):

Men

See also
 Virgin Islands at the 2003 Pan American Games

References

External links
 

Nations at the 2004 Summer Olympics
2004 Summer Olympics
Olympics